Tamworth Public School is situated in East Tamworth, New South Wales, Australia. Over 900 students attend the primary school and it is the oldest school in Tamworth, being established in 1855. The school's mottos are Aim High and Care, Courtesy and Consideration.

See also 
 List of Government schools in New South Wales
Schools in Tamworth, New South Wales

References

External links
Tamworth Public School website

Buildings and structures in Tamworth, New South Wales
Public primary schools in New South Wales
1855 establishments in Australia
Educational institutions established in 1855